Madghacen, also spelled  Medracen or Medghassen or Medrassen or Madghis is a royal mausoleum-temple of the Berber Numidian Kings which stands near Batna city in Aurasius Mons in Numidia, Algeria.

History 

Madghis was a king of independent kingdoms of the Numidia, between 300 and 200 BC Near the time of neighbor King Masinissa and their earliest Roman contacts.
Ibn Khaldun said: Madghis is an ancestor of the Berbers of the branch Botr Zenata, Banu Ifran, Maghrawa (Aimgharen), Marinid, Ziyyanid, and Wattasid.

Threats 

As ICOMOS noted in their 2006/2007 Heritage at Risk report, the mausoleum has become "the victim of major 'repair work' without respect for the value of th[e] monument and its authenticity."

See also

 List of cultural assets of Algeria

References

Further reading 
 Gabriel Camps, Nouvelles observations sur l'architecture et l'âge du Medracen, mausolée royal de Numidie, CRAI, 1973, 117–3, pp. 470–517.
 Yvon Thébert & Filippo Coarelli, Architecture funéraire et pouvoir : réflexions sur l'hellénisme numide, MEFRA, Année 1988 * Serge Lancel, L'Algérie antique, édition Mengès, Paris 2003.

External Links 

 Images of Medracen in Manar al-Athar digital heritage photo archive 

Batna, Algeria
Mausoleums in Algeria
Kingdom of Numidia
Berber mythology
Zenata
Buildings and structures in Batna Province
Berber architecture